Typpö is a Finnish surname. Notable people with the surname include:

 Leonard Typpö (1868–1922), Finnish farmer, lay preacher, and politician
 Taneli Typpö (1878–1960), Finnish farmer and politician

See also
 Teppo (name)

Finnish-language surnames